Crapo is an unincorporated community in Dorchester County, Maryland, United States. Crapo is located along Lakesville-Crapo Road on the east bank of the Honga River in the southern part of the county. It has frequently been noted on lists of unusual place names. The name Crapo comes from "crapaud", which is the French word for toad.

References

Unincorporated communities in Dorchester County, Maryland
Unincorporated communities in Maryland
Maryland populated places on the Chesapeake Bay